WestExec Advisors LLC is a consulting firm founded in 2017 by Antony Blinken, Michèle Flournoy, Sergio Aguirre, and Nitin Chadda, all former Obama administration officials. Lisa Monaco, Robert O. Work, Avril Haines, David S. Cohen, and Jen Psaki have also been WestExec employees. 

In an interview with The Intercept, Flournoy explained WestExec seeks to employ "people recently coming out of government" with "current knowledge, expertise, contacts, networks." The firm and its partners avoid becoming registered lobbyists or foreign agents so that they can (re)enter government service without delays. It does not disclose its clients, whose names are restricted from disclosure by non-disclosure agreements. The firm is named after West Executive Avenue, a street near the West Wing of the White House.

Clients and activities
Although WestExec does not disclose its list of clients, some have been reported. Its clients include Google's Jigsaw; Windward, an Israeli artificial intelligence firm; Shield AI, a drone surveillance company; and "Fortune 100 types".

Under a financial disclosure filed by the Biden transition team in December 2020, Secretary of State nominee Antony Blinken declared that clients of WestExec included "investment giant Blackstone, Bank of America, Facebook, Uber, McKinsey & Company, the Japanese conglomerate SoftBank, the pharmaceutical company Gilead, the investment bank Lazard, Boeing, AT&T, the Royal Bank of Canada, LinkedIn and the venerable Sotheby's". In a similar form, Director of National Intelligence-designate Avril Haines disclosed that WestExec had worked with data-mining company Palantir Technologies.

References

External links

2017 establishments in Washington, D.C.
Consulting firms established in 2017
Foreign policy and strategy think tanks in the United States
Political risk consulting firms